Pick Your King is the title of American hardcore punk band Poison Idea's debut EP, released in 1983 via Fatal Erection Records. The album jacket featured a "choice" of kings (hence the title), one side had an image of Jesus Christ, the other side an image of Elvis Presley, a.k.a. "The King". The EP was reissued in 2005 by Reflex/Wolfpack Records on a compilation 12" also containing the 'Learning To Scream' EP.

Track listing

 "Think Twice" - 0:41
 "It's An Action" - 1:26
 "This Thing Called Progress" - 1:01
 "In My Head Ache" - 1:07
 "Underage" - 0:58
 "Self Abuse" - 0:54
 "Cult Band" - 0:42
 "Last One" - 0:51
 "Pure Hate" - 1:41
 "Castration" - 0:28
 "(I Hate) Reggae" - 1:18
 "Give It Up" - 0:27
 "Think Fast" - 1:06

Personnel

 Jerry A. - Vocals
 Tom "Pig Champion" Roberts - Guitar
 Chris Tense - Bass
 Dean Johnson - Drums

References

External links
Reflex/Wolfpack Records page on Discogs

1983 EPs
Poison Idea albums